Zhinan Temple Station is a station on the Maokong Gondola of the Taipei Rapid Transit System, located in Wenshan District, Taipei, Taiwan. It is named for the nearby Zhinan Temple.

Around the station
 Zhinan Temple

See also
 Maokong Gondola

2007 establishments in Taiwan
Maokong Gondola stations